The Moscow legislative election of 1997 were held December 14 of that year to the Moscow City Duma, the city's unicameral parliament (city council).

Participated in the election were 28 associations and four electoral blocs.

Background
In 1995, the deputies refused to schedule new elections and instead extended their term for a further two years. This provoked a two-year court case that ended this summer with a ruling that the Duma had acted illegally in extending its powers.

Campaign
The "Nikolai Gonchar" bloc was the only bloc that has adopted a platform critical of the way Mayor Yury Luzhkov runs the city. Among posters were "In this city, there should be a separation of powers, but the present Moscow City Duma is nothing but a pie with no filling". The bloc, which was set up by the "Our City" movement, the Moscow Association of Councils of Territorial and Social Self-Government, and the Moscow branch of the Democratic Party of Russia, includes 33 candidate. "My Moscow" bloc campaign stressed that "Muscovites support the Mayor's actions" and focused on solving the city's ecological and transportation problems.

References

Legislative elections in Moscow
1997 elections in Russia
1997 in Moscow